Disloque en Mar del Plata (English: Chaos in Mar del Plata) is a 1964 Argentine film, directed by Conrado Diana.

Cast
 Délfor
 Jorge Porcel
 Calígula
 Mengueche
 Belinda
 Isabel Lainer
 Vicente La Russa
 Carlos Ferreyra
 Anita Almada
 Ámbar La Fox
 Alejandro Maurín
 René Oliver
 Raúl Rossi
 Ernesto Báez

References

External links
 

1964 films
1960s Spanish-language films
Argentine black-and-white films
Films shot in Mar del Plata
1960s Argentine films